The 2013 First Division season was the 34th of the amateur  competition of the first-tier football in Guinea-Bissau.  The tournament was organized by the Football Federation of Guinea-Bissau.  The season began on 12 January and finished on 16 June.  Balantas won their fourth and recent title and finished with 40 points and later competed in the 2004 CAF Champions League the following season. Estrela de Cantanhez (Third Division participant) won the 2013 Guinea-Bissau Cup and later competed in the 2014 CAF Confederation Cup the following season.

There was no competition last season due to financial concerns.

It was an 18 match season and had a total of 90 matches. A total of 170 goals were scored.

AC Bissorã was the defending team of the title. Benfica Bissau scored the most goals and numbered 23, Balantas and Sporting Bafatá were second with 23 goals and Bissorã scored the least with 10. On the opposites, Os Balantas conceded the least with 8 and Académica Ingoré conceded the most with 26.

Participating clubs

 Sporting Clube de Bafatá
 Sporting Clube de Bissau
 Sport Portos de Bissau
 Sport Bissau e Benfica
 Atlético Clube de Bissorã

 Cuntum FC
 UDI Bissau - Promoted from the Second Division
 Mavegro Futebol Clube
 Académica de Ingoré - Promoted from the Second Division
 CF Os Balantas

Overview
The league was contested by 10 teams with Os Balantas winning the championship.

League standings

See also
Campeonato Nacional da Guiné-Bissau

Footnotes

External links
Historic results at rsssf.com

Guinea-Bissau
Football in Guinea-Bissau